The Newcastle District was a historic district in Upper Canada which existed until 1849. It was formed in 1802 from the Home District, consisting of the counties of Durham and Northumberland.

History
The legislature had enacted in 1798 that "as soon as there are one thousand souls within the said counties, and that six of the townships therein do hold town meetings according to law," the government shall constitute them as a separate district; which was done in 1802.

The district town was originally Newcastle, located near the current town of Brighton, and then Amherst, later renamed Cobourg.

In 1841, the northern part of the District was detached to form the Colborne District, consisting of Peterborough County. It consisted of the following territory:

In 1850, the district was dissolved, and replaced with the United Counties of Northumberland and Durham that was established for municipal purposes.

Further reading
Armstrong, Frederick H. Handbook of Upper Canadian Chronology. Toronto : Dundurn Press, 1985.

References

History of the Regional Municipality of Durham
Districts of Upper Canada
1802 establishments in Upper Canada
1849 disestablishments in Canada